Acqualagna is a comune (municipality) in the Province of Pesaro e Urbino in the Italian region Marche, located about  west of Ancona and about  southwest of Pesaro. It is one of the main centers in Italy for truffle. The Candigliano is joined by the Burano in the vicinity of the town.

Acqualagna borders the following municipalities: Cagli, Fermignano, Urbania, Urbino.

History
The current name derives from the Latin name Aqua Lanea, meaning "Water Slaughter", and which remembered the battle of Gualdo Tadino fought nearby between Totila's Ostrogoth and Narses's Byzantine armies during the Gothic Wars.

In the neighbourhood existed the Roman town of Pitinum Mergens, destroyed by Alarich I. The survivors founded the castle of Montefalcone, from which the current Acqualagna evolved.

Main sights

Parish church, with traces of 15th-16th century frescoes.
Pelingo Sanctuary
San Vincenzo al Furlo, what remains of a 7th-century abbey in which resided St. Romuald (1011) and Pier Damiani (1042). The current church, in Romanesque style, was founded by abbot Bonaventura in 1271. The crypt has ancient columns and a 9th-10th century altar.
Villa di Colombara, where a Roman farm has been excavated.
Furlo Gorge: one of the most spectacular gorges in Italy, with a 2000-year-old Roman tunnel
Pietralata Sanctuary: nestled in the hills adjoining to the gorge lays this wonderful restored small monastery

Demographic evolution

References

External links
 Homepage of the city

Cities and towns in the Marche
Articles which contain graphical timelines